Pradosia montana is a species of plant in the family Sapotaceae. It is endemic to Ecuador. The Latin specific epithet montana refers to mountains or coming from mountains.

References

Flora of Ecuador
montana
Vulnerable plants
Taxonomy articles created by Polbot